Jónsson is a surname of Icelandic origin, meaning son of Jón. In Icelandic names, the name is not strictly a surname, but a patronymic. The name refers to:
Arnar Jónsson (actor) (born 1943), Icelandic actor
Arnar Jónsson (basketball) (born 1983), Icelandic basketball player
Arngrímur Jónsson “The Learned” (1568-1648), Icelandic scholar
Bjarni Jónsson (1920–2016), Icelandic mathematician and logician
Bjarni Jónsson (artist) (1934-2008), Icelandic painter
Bjarni Jónsson (footballer) (born 1965), Icelandic international footballer
Björn Jónsson (1846-1912), Icelandic prime minister
Eggert Jónsson (born 1988), Icelandic footballer
Einar Jónsson (1874-1954), Icelandic sculptor
Emil Jónsson (1902-1986), Icelandic prime minister
Finnur Jónsson (philologist) (1858-1934), Icelandic philologist
Helgi Jónsson (1867-1925), Icelandic botanist and algologist
Hjálmar Jónsson (disambiguation)
Jón Jónsson, Icelandic singer
Jón Sveinbjørn Jónsson (1955–2008), Norwegian poet
Jóhannes Jónsson (1940–2013), Icelandic businessman
Kristján Jónsson (politician) (1852-1926), Icelandic prime minister
Magnús Jónsson (disambiguation)
Ríkarður Jónsson (1888-1972), Icelandic sculptor
Ríkharður Jónsson (1929–2017), Icelandic footballer
Sigurður Jónsson (disambiguation)
Sævar Jónsson (born 1957), Icelandic footballer
Todi Jónsson (born 1972), Faroese footballer
Ásgrímur Jónsson (1876-1958), Icelandic painter

See also
Jonsson
Jönsson
Jónsdóttir

Icelandic-language surnames
Surnames from given names